Burke William Moses (born December 10, 1959, New York City) is an American actor. His older brother is actor Mark Moses.

Career
Moses attended Boston University and Carnegie Mellon University. He performed the role of "Joe" at the New York City Opera in The Most Happy Fella in 1991. He appeared in the musical 1776 at the Williamstown Theatre Festival in June to July 1991, and in the Off-Broadway Public Theater production of The Way of the World in May 1991.

Moses first appeared on Broadway as a replacement in the role of Sky Masterson in the 1992 revival of Guys and Dolls. He originated the role of Gaston in Disney's Beauty and the Beast in 1994 on Broadway, as well as in the Los Angeles and London West End productions. He succeeded Brian Stokes Mitchell in the roles of Fred Graham/Petruchio in the Broadway revival of Kiss Me, Kate in January 2001. He played Herakles in the 2004 production of Sondheim's The Frogs. He appeared as Adam in Seven Brides for Seven Brothers at Goodspeed Opera House in 2005.

Moses played El Gallo in the 2006 off-Broadway revival of the musical The Fantasticks. In 2008, he  played the role of Captain von Trapp in Mirvish Productions' The Sound of Music at the Princess of Wales Theatre in Toronto alongside the winner of the TV show How Do You Solve a Problem Like Maria?, Elicia MacKenzie.

In 2012, he starred in The Music Man (Harold Hill) with Kate Baldwin (Marian), at Arena Stage in Washington, D.C. He appeared as "The Grinch" in Dr. Seuss' How the Grinch Stole Christmas! at the Old Globe Theatre, San Diego, in November 2014.

In 2015, he starred in the Vineyard Theatre's Off-Broadway production of Gigantic, which premiered on December 3, 2015.

Moses appeared in several New York City Center Encores! staged concert versions of musicals: DuBarry Was a Lady (1996), Lil' Abner (1998), and The New Moon (2003).

He also appeared in the soap operas Loving, As the World Turns and One Life to Live as well as guest-starred on various television series, including The Nanny. He appeared in the NBC unaired test pilot as the original Gavin Stone for the sitcom Good Morning, Miami in 2002.

In 2014, Moses became the author of Stanislavski Never Wore Tap Shoes: Musical Theater Acting Craft, a book focusing on acting on the musical stage.

Filmography

Video games

References

External links

Playbill.com: Everything's Coming Up Moses
Broadway.com StarFile
Photos at BroadwayWorld.com

1959 births
Living people
American male stage actors
American male television actors
Male actors from New York City
20th-century American male actors
21st-century American male actors
People from Greater Los Angeles